Covert is an unincorporated community in Covert Township, Osborne County, Kansas, United States.  It is located southwest of Osborne.

History
Covert was founded and laid out in 1880. At its height, the population was 150.

A post office was opened at Covert in 1873, and remained in operation until it was discontinued in 1961.

The town is known for the 1923 discovery of the Covert Meteorite, and for "the unsolved murders of the Albert Kaser family in 1928".

Geography

Climate
The climate in this area is characterized by hot, humid summers and generally mild to cool winters. According to the Köppen Climate Classification system, Covert has a humid subtropical climate, abbreviated "Cfa" on climate maps.

Education
Covert's rural high school district was organized in 1915. The high school burned down in 1951, and was closed permanently the following year. The school did not have a mascot until 1947–1951, when it was Covert Wildcats. The town team mascot was Covert Coyotes.

References

Further reading

External links 
 Covert Kansas - an Osborne County ghost town
 Covert, Kansas topo map
 Osborne County maps: Current, Historic, KDOT

Unincorporated communities in Osborne County, Kansas
Unincorporated communities in Kansas